Trinity Methodist Church, also known as Old Trinity Methodist Church, is a historic Methodist church and national historic district located at Broad and Lower Streets in Elizabethtown, Bladen County, North Carolina.  It was built about 1848, and is a two-story, rectangular, frame Federal-style church.  Surrounding the church on three sides is the church cemetery.

It was added to the National Register of Historic Places in 1989.

References

Methodist churches in North Carolina
Historic districts on the National Register of Historic Places in North Carolina
Churches on the National Register of Historic Places in North Carolina
Federal architecture in North Carolina
Churches completed in 1848
19th-century Methodist church buildings in the United States
Churches in Bladen County, North Carolina
National Register of Historic Places in Bladen County, North Carolina